Rusty DeWees (born November 15, 1960) is an American actor, producer and writer. He works regionally in Vermont, Off-Broadway, in television, and films. He is best known for his one-man comedy show, The Logger.

Early life
Rusty DeWees was born in Philadelphia, Pennsylvania, the son of Marilyn Mason DeWees, a homemaker and newspaper business manager, and William Wallace DeWees, a Greyhound bus driver. He is the younger brother of Holly DeWees. DeWees is Dutch, meaning "the orphan". He attended Stowe High School, where he played basketball, and percussion in the school band. He also performed in high school theater productions. After graduating high school DeWees, worked as a school bus driver, basketball coach, stonemason, and logger. During a town team basketball game, Champlain College coach Robert Tipson noticed him and recruited him to play basketball on the team.  After graduating, he worked as a gas jockey in Burlington, Vermont.

Career
DeWees acted in Burlington with Vermont Repertory Theater under the direction of Robert R. Ringer before moving to New York City in 1989 to pursue an acting career.

In New York, DeWees worked as an assistant to William J. Doyle of William Doyle Galleries, while doing commercials and movies on the side.

Known for his authentic rural appearance, DeWees appeared in the films: Black Dog, A Stranger in the Kingdom,  Pieces of April, Radical Jack, Mud Season, Where the Rivers Flow North, and The Devil's Own. DeWees also appeared in Law and Order, The Cosby Mysteries, and various soap operas.

While working on the Patrick Swayze movie, Black Dog, he met the singer Meat Loaf, who gave DeWees advice on how to produce his one-man play, The Logger, a comedy in Two Ax, for which he is best known in and around New England.

DeWees has also written two books, Scrawlins,  and Scrawlins Too compilations of short essays.

Awards
DeWees won Best Actor at the Los Angeles Method Fest Film Festival for his role as Jerry in Mud Season.

Personal life
DeWees was raised in Stowe, Vermont, and attended the Stowe Community Church.

In addition to acting, DeWees is a musician and plays with his band, The Fellers. DeWees also races stock cars at Thunder Road Speedbowl. DeWees works with charities, Ronald McDonald House, Make-a-Wish, and Meals on Wheels. He does motivational speaking to high schools and businesses.

Filmography
The following is the Filmography by American Actor, Producer, Writer, and Comedian Rusty DeWees.

Film

Television

References

External links
 Personal website

Living people
1960 births
Male actors from Philadelphia
American male comedians
Comedians from Pennsylvania
Writers from Philadelphia
20th-century American male actors
20th-century American comedians
20th-century American writers
Comedians from Vermont
Writers from Burlington, Vermont
Male actors from Vermont
20th-century American male writers
21st-century American comedians
Champlain College alumni